Ate Faber (19 March 1894 – 19 March 1962) was a Dutch fencer. He competed in the team sabre event at the 1936 Summer Olympics.

References

External links
 

1894 births
1962 deaths
Dutch male sabre fencers
Olympic fencers of the Netherlands
Fencers at the 1936 Summer Olympics
Sportspeople from Leeuwarden
20th-century Dutch people